Okeke is a Nigerian surname of Igbo origin. Notable people with the surname include:

Chuma Okeke (b. 1998), American basketball player
Edward Ikem Okeke (1942–1995), a Nigerian politician
Francisca Nneka Okeke, physicist
P.N. Okeke-Ojiudu (1914–1995), Nigerian first republic politician and businessman
Uzooma Okeke (b. 1970), Canadian football player
Uche Okeke (1933–2016), Nigerian artist

Igbo-language surnames